Torodora styloidea is a moth in the family Lecithoceridae. It is found in Guangxi, China.

The wingspan is 25–30 mm. The forewings are evenly covered with brown scales and there is a weak yellowish patch at two thirds of the costa. The hindwings are light brown and broader than the forewings.

Etymology
The specific name is derived from Latin styl and oides and refers to the shape of lateral lobes of juxta.

References

Moths described in 2010
Torodora